George Venables-Vernon may refer to:

 George Venables-Vernon, 1st Baron Vernon (1709-1780)
 George Venables-Vernon, 2nd Baron Vernon (1735-1830)
 George Charles Venables-Vernon, 4th Baron Vernon (1779–1835), Baron Vernon
 George John Venables-Vernon, 5th Baron Vernon (1803–1866)
 George William Henry Venables-Vernon, 7th Baron Vernon (1854–1898)
 George Venables-Vernon, 8th Baron Vernon (1888–1915), Baron Vernon

See also
George Vernon (disambiguation)
George Venables, Welsh journalist and barrister